Rainy Creek may refer to:

 Rainy Creek (Lennox and Addington County), a creek in Ontario
 Rainy Creek (Missouri), a stream